Rocky Run Township was a township in Hancock County, Illinois, USA.  As of the 2010 census, its population was 158 and it contained 60 housing units. In November 2016, the township voted to merge with Wilcox Township due to low population. It is now part of Rocky Run-Wilcox Township.

Geography

Cemeteries
The township contains these four cemeteries: Crenshaw, Fletcher, Mount Vernon Missionary Baptist and Oak Valley Missionary.
Daugherty

Major highways
  Illinois Route 96

Airports and landing strips
 H Meeker Airport
 Meeker Airport

Demographics

School districts
 Community Unit School District 4
 Warsaw Community Unit School District 316

Political districts
 Illinois's 17th congressional district
 State House District 94
 State Senate District 47

References
 United States Census Bureau 2008 TIGER/Line Shapefiles
 
 United States National Atlas

External links
 City-Data.com
 Illinois State Archives
 Township Officials of Illinois

Townships in Hancock County, Illinois
Former townships in Illinois
Former populated places in Illinois
Populated places disestablished in 2016